Terebratellidina is one of two existing suborders of Terebratulid brachiopods, the other being Terebratulidina.

Classification 
 Superfamily Kraussinoidea
 Superfamily Laqueoidea
 Superfamily Megathyridoidea
 Superfamily Platidioidea
 Superfamily Terebratelloidea
 Family Dallinidae
 Family Ecnomiosidae
 Family Terebratellidae
 Family Thaumatosiidae
 Superfamily Zeillerioidea
 Superfamily Bouchardioidea
 Superfamily Gwynioidea
 Superfamily Kingenoidea
 Superfamily Incertae sedis
 Family Tythothyrididae

References 

 World Register of Marine Species accessed 17 May 2011

Protostome suborders
Terebratulida